Kewa is a genus of flowering plants, consisting of eight species of succulent sub-woody plants, native to eastern and southern Africa, including Saint Helena and Madagascar. These are small shrubs or herbs that form cushions and have edible, acid-tasting leaves. Kewa is the only genus in the family Kewaceae.

The species were formerly included in the genus Hypertelis of the family Molluginaceae, but molecular studies have shown that most species did not belong there, but were rather distantly related to Molluginaceae, being placed in a clade comprising Aizoaceae, Gisekiaceae and Barbeuiaceae. Only the type species Hypertelis spergulacea remains in Molluginaceae; all others are transferred to the genus Kewa, which was named for Kew, where the Royal Botanic Gardens, Kew are situated.

Species
Species transferred to Kewa from Hypertelis in 2014 were:
Kewa acida (Hook.f.) Christenh. – Saint Helena
Kewa angrae-pequenae (Friedrich) Christenh. – Namibia, South Africa
Kewa arenicola (Sond.) Christenh. – South Africa
Kewa bowkeriana (Sond.) Christenh. – Ethiopia, Kenya, Tanzania, Mozambique, Zimbabwe, Botswana, Namibia, South Africa
Kewa caespitosa (Friedrich) Christenh. – Namibia, South Africa
Kewa salsoloides (Burch.) Christenh. – Mozambique, Angola, Namibia, South Africa
Kewa suffruticosa (Baker) Christenh. – Madagascar
Kewa trachysperma (Adamson) Christenh. – South Africa

Cultivation 
Plants are perennial but relatively short lived. They can easily be propagated from seed and make attractive cushion-like shrubs with leathery leaves and many starry white flowers.

References 

Caryophyllales
Caryophyllales genera
Flora of Africa
Taxa named by Maarten J. M. Christenhusz